Oryong Station is a station of Daejeon Metro Line 1 in Oryu-dong, Jung District, Daejeon, South Korea.

External links

  Oryong Station from Daejeon Metropolitan Express Transit Corporation

Daejeon Metro stations
Jung District, Daejeon
Railway stations opened in 2006